Lakhansipur is a village in Azamgarh district, Uttar Pradesh, India.

References

Villages in Azamgarh district